Kurt Elliot Seibert (born October 16, 1955 in Cheverly, Maryland) is a former Major League Baseball second baseman. In seven career games, he had no hits in two at-bats. He was a switch-hitter, who threw right-handed.

Seibert was drafted by the Cubs in the third round of the 1976 draft.

He attended Clemson University.

Seibert currently lives in Charlotte, North Carolina where he teaches and coaches JV baseball for Carmel Christian School.

References

External links 

1955 births
Living people
Baseball players from Maryland
Chicago Cubs players
Clemson Tigers baseball players
Georgia State Panthers baseball coaches
Major League Baseball second basemen
People from Cheverly, Maryland
Pompano Beach Cubs players
Clemson Tigers baseball coaches
Gulf Coast Cubs players
Midland Cubs players
Toledo Mud Hens players
Wichita Aeros players